Cornerstone EP is a live EP by Hillsong Church and was released in May 2012.

The album includes two songs in two different versions, live and studio.

Track listing

References

2012 EPs
2012 live albums
Hillsong Music live albums
es:Cornerstone